Dubulti Station is a railway station on the Torņakalns – Tukums II Railway of the Latvian Railways system.

It is located in the Dubulti District of the city of Jūrmala, in the Riga region of Latvia.

History
The first station was opened here in 1877.

The current Modernist style concrete building was completed in 1977. The sculptural concrete shell structural section resembles a wave, and was claimed as the most modern station building in the Latvian Soviet Socialist Republic. It was designed by the Soviet architect Igors Javeins (1903—1980).

The station also had a refurbishment in 2015 removing one platform and modernizing the others.

References

External links 

Railway stations in Latvia
Jūrmala
Concrete shell structures
Modernist architecture
Buildings and structures completed in 1977
1977 establishments in Latvia
Architecture in Latvia
Architecture in the Soviet Union
Railway stations in the Russian Empire opened in 1877